Cordylopteryx is a genus of tephritid  or fruit flies in the family Tephritidae.

Species
Cordylopteryx lesneae Séguy, 1933
Cordylopteryx marshalli Bezzi, 1924

References

Tephritinae
Tephritidae genera
Diptera of Africa